The Essex County Hospital Center, also known as the Overbrook Hospital, the Overbrook Asylum, or simply the Overbrook, was a psychiatric hospital that was located around 125 Fairview Avenue in the Township of Cedar Grove, New Jersey. It was used as a general hospital then converted to house patients afflicted with mental disorders. The original hospital was located at the edge of the Hilltop Reservation and designated a Conservation Easement in 2001 by the New Jersey Department of Environmental Protection, the site now is part of the Essex County park system. A new hospital opened in 2006, and the site of the original hospital was converted to a park and townhomes in 2017.

History

In 1896, a large portion of land was purchased by the City of Newark, New Jersey; the land was bought to build a new hospital to relieve pressure in the overcrowded Newark Hospital. During the late 1800s and early 1900s, many buildings were built that housed patients and other facilities, such as a power house, laundromat, and theater. According to Weird New Jersey, in the winter of 1917, the hospital suffered a catastrophe with the failure of the hospital's boilers and 24 patients freezing to death in their beds. In the mid-1920s,  the tri-state mental correction board bought the land and converted Overbrook into a mental institution. The Overbrook asylum ran on, adding several add-ons and new wards until its  closure in the winter of 2007.

New hospital
In late 2006, the new Essex County Hospital Center  opened just down the road from the site of the original Overbrook Hospital. This center houses chronically ill psychiatric patients in need of longer lengths of stay than are available in community hospitals and medical centers. The new center takes a cutting edge approach to behavioral health care and its layout and programs stand in stark contrast to the hundred-year-old facility it replaced. It is located at 204 Grove Avenue in Cedar Grove.

Future of the former hospital
After years of back and forth of what the old hospitals in Cedar Grove were to become, county spokesman Anthony Puglisi stated that the property of these hospitals will become a park. This statement was made in 2015
and the project was completed in 2017. The vast 77 acres purchased by the county now is partially a park. This is now the 23rd space to be added to the Essex County park system. The remaining space was turned into townhomes and condominiums.

Directors
Henry Alexander Davidson from 1957 to 1969.

In popular culture
The hospital was a major filming location for the 2007 films Methodic and Subject 87.
The hospital was a major filming location for the 2008 film Choke.
In 2008, the hospital was featured on the paranormal reality series Ghost Adventures on the Travel Channel, but due to privacy, the name and location were not revealed.
In 2009, the hospital was featured on Syfy's paranormal reality shows  Ghost Hunters, Ghost Hunters: Live Halloween Countdown, and Ghost Hunters Academy.  
Wheeler Antabanez has written extensively about The Essex County Hospital Center. His Overbrook web page contains videos, photos and essays about the abandoned hospital center including documentation of the demolition process.
The hospital is the featured location for the online interactive film White Enamel. In the story, the hospital is referred to the fictional name of "Glenfield Psychiatric Hospital."
In 2017, a paperback book entitled Images of America: Essex County Overbrook Hospital was released by Arcadia Publishing detailing the history of the complex. The book contains both historical images of the hospital as well as recent photographs from the demolition.
This hospital was also featured in a show called “The Scariest Night of My Life”.

References

External links
Weird NJ History, Photos, Legends of Essex County Hospital (AKA Overbrook Asylum for the Insane).
Antiquity Echoes History, present day photos, and video of the Essex County Hospital Center grounds.
Shadows and Rust  Recent photographs of the inside and outside of the site prior to demolition.
North Jersey Exploration Pictures of Overbrook Hospital.
Vacant New Jersey Photographs of Essex County Hospital Center.
White Enamel Interactive imagery and film using the Essex County Hospital Center.

Hospital
Hospitals established in 1896
Psychiatric hospitals in New Jersey
Defunct hospitals in New Jersey
Hospitals in Essex County, New Jersey
Unused buildings in New Jersey
Reportedly haunted locations in New Jersey